Daniel Martin Coughlin (June 9, 1897 – January 8, 1963) was an American football player.  A native of Faribault, Minnesota, he played college football for St. Thomas and Notre Dame and professional football in the National Football League (NFL) as a back for the Minneapolis Marines.

Football career
Playing for Notre Dame, a knee injury derailed Coughlin's 1920 season. Coughlin gained notoriety for his play in the 1921 season, where he played on both sides of the ball. He also played basketball and was on the track team at Notre Dame. Coughlin joined a club team in Duluth, Minnesota and also coached the Cathedral High School football team in 1922.

He appeared in two NFL games, both as a starter with the Minneapolis Marines, during the 1923 season. In 1924, Coughlin, then residing in Waseca, Minnesota, was recruited by the Duluth Kelleys.

Personal life
Coughlin studied journalism at Notre Dame.

References

1897 births
1963 deaths
People from Faribault, Minnesota
People from Waseca, Minnesota
Minneapolis Marines players
Players of American football from Minnesota
Notre Dame Fighting Irish football players
Notre Dame Fighting Irish men's basketball players
Notre Dame Fighting Irish men's track and field athletes
St. Thomas (Minnesota) Tommies football players